"Come In Out of the Pain" is a song written by Don Pfrimmer and Frank J. Myers, and recorded by American country music singer Doug Stone.  It was released in March 1992 as the third and final single from his album I Thought It Was You.  It peaked at number 3 on both the Billboard Hot Country Singles & Tracks chart on The Canadian RPM Tracks chart.

Chart performance

Year-end charts

References

1992 singles
Doug Stone songs
Songs written by Frank J. Myers
Epic Records singles
Song recordings produced by Doug Johnson (record producer)
Songs written by Don Pfrimmer
1991 songs